Helena Maria Viramontes (born February 26, 1954) is an American fiction writer and professor of English. She is known for her two novels, Under the Feet of Jesus and Their Dogs Came With Them, and is considered one of the most significant figures in the early canon of Chicano literature. Viramontes is currently the Goldwin Smith Professor of English at Cornell University.

Childhood and education
Viramontes was born in East Los Angeles on February 26, 1954, to Serafin Viramontes, and Maria Louise La Brada Viramontes. She was one of eight siblings in a working-class family.

Viramontes graduated from Garfield High School, one of the high schools that participated in the 1968 Chicano Blowouts, a series of protests against unequal conditions in East Los Angeles public schools. The Chicano Movement played a significant role in her development as a writer and the writing style she developed reflected her understanding and upbringing in the streets of East Los Angeles. She then worked part-time while attending Immaculate Heart College, from which she earned her Bachelor of Arts in English literature in 1975.

While a grad student in the English department at Cal State L.A., Viramontes was told by a professor that she did not belong there because she was writing about Latino issues. Also, while attending a graduate program in creative writing at the University of California, Irvine (UCI) in the early 1980s, “a professor told me not to write about Chicanos, but to write about people.” She left the program, but returned to complete her MFA a decade later. In 1977, her short story "Requiem for the Poor" was awarded a prize from Statement Magazine. In 1979, she won a literary prize from the Spanish department at UC Irvine for her short story "Birthday." She returned to the fine arts program at UCI in 1990 and graduated with a Masters of Fine Arts in 1994.

Professional career

Viramontes' career began in the Chicano magazine ChismeArte as a literary editor. Her short stories have been published in a variety of literary journals. The major themes of her stories are informed by her childhood experiences in East Los Angeles, and the impact of César Chávez and the United Farm Workers on the life of her family. Viramontes writing often tell stories of forgotten minority communities. Many of her works feature strong female characters, and child protagonists figure prominently into her work. Other works have been deemed "democratic novels", in that no single protagonist dominates the storyline. Throughout all of her work, a love of life and of all of humanity pervades, despite poverty and the other challenges her characters face.

In 1985, Arte Público Press published The Moths, collection of short stories.  Helena Maria Viramontes took a break from her work, got married and had two children. During her hiatus from academia she published in many underground literary journals such as ChismeArte. In 1988, she co-edited Chicana Creativity and Criticism with María Herrera-Sobek, a volume dedicated to the literary output of Mexican-American women. She also returned to UC Irvine to complete her MFA, which was awarded in 1994. As part of the program, she received a grant from the National Endowment for the Arts to attend a writing workshop with the Colombian Nobel Laureate Gabriel García Márquez. In 1995, her first novel Under the Feet of Jesus was published to critical acclaim. In 2007, she published Their Dogs Came With Them, a novel that took her 17 years to complete. It was noted for its strikingly personal and realistic prose, and discusses harsh realities and social conditions of the poor. The novel was largely inspired by her childhood in the midst of East Los Angeles, with the gang conflicts and social strife at the center of her novel.  She has said that her house is next to four cemeteries, and that when the freeways were built in East Los Angeles in the 1960s (see East LA Freeway) myth has it that the cement was poured over the resting places of some forgotten souls, their bones disturbed.

Viramontes is currently the Goldwin Smith Professor of English at Cornell University.

Awards and honors 
 National Endowment for the Arts National Endowment for the Arts, 1/1989
 Fellowship, Sundance Institute, 7/1989
 Under the Feet of Jesus, New Voices Quality Paperback Book, 1995
 Under the Feet of Jesus, finalist, Discover Great New Writers, 1996
 John Dos Passos Prize for Literature, 1996
 The Moths exhibited in Autrey Museum of Western Heritage, 5/1998-9/1998
 Alumna of the year, Immaculate Heart College, 10/2000
 Doctor of Humanities, Honoris Causa, St. Mary's College of Notre Dame, 5/2000
 Featured with John Steinbeck and Carlos Bulosan on Oregon Public Broadcasting,"American Passages—A Literary Survey" #12, "The Migrant Struggle"
 Luis Leal Award, Santa Barbara Festival of Books,   2006 
 Outstanding Latino/a Cultural Award in Literary Arts or Publications, 2007
 United States Artists Fellowship, 2007

First novel: Under the Feet of Jesus
Under the Feet of Jesus (Penguin, 1995) follows the lives of thirteen-year-old Estrella, her brothers and sisters, her mother Petra, Petra's lover Perfecto, and the cousins Alejo and Gumecindo, all Latino migrant workers living and working in the California grape fields. Since the novel's dedication refers to Cesar Chavez, who led migrant laborers to ask for better wages and conditions, Chavez' actions in such movements as the Delano Grape Strike must be considered as background to the novel's fictions.

The story reflects the hardships of the migrants’ lives set against the beauty of the landscape. It reflects, as critics Carballo and Giles have noted, multiple "initiation stories," many of which revolve around the friendship and love unfolding between Estrella and Alejo. The novel's limited omniscient narrator moves in and out of the consciousnesses of the main characters, a technique which allows readers to view characters' motivations, and which Viramontes herself says is a product of the ways that the characters of the novel told her their story.

Chapter 1 begins with the family driving to the fields to harvest the fruit. The chapter draws the personalities of the main characters on emotional, spiritual, and physical levels; we learn of the hardships that they experience as migrant workers. Petra, the mother, abandoned by her husband and raising five children alone, has endured bouts of insanity and self-mutilation. She meets Perfecto, who fixes things with his toolbox so well that, after he finishes, customers exclaim, Perfecto! A hare-lipped child cuts himself and is entertained by shadow-puppetry until he forgets his injuries. Gumecindo and Alejo pick peaches, not to eat, but to sell. In a darkened, derelict barn, a mysterious chain dangles from the ceiling, and the sounds of birds fill the darkness. The novel proceeds in a series of striking images stemming from Viramontes' work at the time, on a film.

Working back and forth between Estrella's and Alejo's puppy-love and Perfecto's memories, Chapter 2 develops several conflicts. Perfecto, now age 73, recalls falling in love with his first wife, Mercedes[3], and the loss of an infant, his first child. He hides his hope to leave Petra's family and return forever to the scenes of his early love with Mercedes. He asks Estrella to help him tear down the derelict barn for a payment that will fund his trip. Meanwhile, Estrella meets Alejo at a dance, where they begin to fall in love. Alejo and Estrella discuss the La Brea Tar Pits, which are, according to the critic Burford, a trope for forces which devour.

In Chapter 3, Alejo is sick with the daño of the fields (pesticide poisoning). He is sicker, according to Perfecto, than any yerba (herb) or prayer can heal. The family decides to take Alejo to a clinic but is halted when their station wagon is stuck in deep mud. Everyone helps except Alejo, who can barely pick his chin up.

In Chapter 4, Estrella and her family finally arrive at a remote, worn-down clinic. The only staff member, a nurse, seems distant from Alejo and unwilling to give him any but the most clinical of attentions. She suggests that the family take the boy to a hospital; however, she does not recognize how very little money the family has to pay the clinic's fee, to buy gasoline, or to pay a doctor's bill. Estrella repeatedly recommends Perfecto to the nurse as a repairman, so that the migrants can barter his work for medical services rather than pay money for them; the nurse repeatedly cannot read the vast gulf between even her small earning power and her patients’. At last, Estrella threatens the nurse with a crow bar, takes back the meager fee she had paid the clinic, and uses the money to buy gasoline to take Alejo to a hospital, where the family leaves him to the doctors’ care and to his fate.

In Chapter 5, the family arrives at their shack without Alejo. The dirty dishes are where they left them. The younger children fall asleep. Although Petra has not yet told Perfecto that she is pregnant with his child, he is aware of the developing infant and recoils from the responsibility. Leaning against the decrepit car, he mourns for the places he left in memory and the money he does not have to return. Petra is awake and restless and resolves to pray. Estrella rushes off, lantern in hand, to the only place she feels temporarily free, the old barn. As the novel ends, she is standing on the roof, silhouetted against a starry sky.

The novel's meaning develops partly through plot and partly through imagery evoked through the novel's lush language. The plot lets readers know how delicate is the balance between having enough to eat and not, between sanity and insanity, between health and incapacitating illness. Exasperatingly, the loveliness of natural scenery and of acts of human decency almost mock the workers’ frailty and hardship. The mountains and stars, frequently described, endure beyond human carelessness, ignorance, and cruelty. Peaches evoke the deliciousness of food and eating, and food's unavailability to many. Rotting fruit evoke preciousness, such as human talent, that is daily wasted. Blood, aching backs, feet, hands, eyes, all mentioned frequently, remind readers how much human life is housed in a body which must stay safe and healthy in order to live. Viramontes notes that she had "to think about the stories of the mujeres out there, their sheer arrogance to survive, their incredible strength to take care of others." The juxtaposition of Petra, carrying her child, and her daughter's figure silhouetted against the sky at the novel's close emphasizes Viramontes' chicana feminism.

Viramontes often uses her works as witness to history, or as a voice for those who do not have a public platform upon which to speak (see, e.g., her short story "The Cariboo Cafe," (in The Moths and Other Stories 65–82) her novel, Their Dogs Came with Them and the article "Xicanismo"). In interviews she evinces a longtime commitment to civil rights.  Her commitment to rights is not abstract, since Viramontes' own parents harvested grapes during her youth.  The novel likewise reflects Viramontes' feminism in her creation of strong female characters. Of these, Carballo and Giles report, "Women in this novel rescue themselves."

Their Dogs Came with Them
Readers typically want a happy ending in any novel. Their Dogs Came with Them Viramontes demonstrates why a happy ending may not be possible. Cuevas, in her study of Viramontes' work,  suggests that happy endings do not always occur for Latinas, and queer Latinas. People in these communities do not overcome disparities and systems of oppression, and violence. Similarly, Pattison suggests that people in urban communities are deprived of their political connections to the space and erasure of memory sites.  Communities are sacrificed in the name of urban expansion.

Viramontes’ novel showcases the 1960s freeway construction in East Los Angeles in which Mexican American sites of cultural memory were permanently erased. The author emphasizes the traumatic relationship between the characters and their disappearing community. In the novel Viramontes focuses on the Chicano movement that the young characters joined during a time in which the freeway threatened the erasure of their community and culture. She also creates a space to imagine Latina futures from a broken ground, unredeemed past or non-redemptive history. She maps the lives of four Latinas who navigate personal and political unrest with their communities while emphasizing how Chicanas and queer-Latinas have been an integral part of Chicana/o history. Her character's identities are intertwined with their communities through the imagery and metaphors of their bodies. She is able to articulate positive and negative dynamics within their neighborhood during the turbulent time of the freeway construction.

Selected works

Criticism 

Beyond Stereotypes: A Critical Analysis of Chicana Literature (Contributor, 1985). 
Chicana Creativity and Criticism (Contributor and editor, 1988) .

Novels 

Under the Feet of Jesus (1995) 
Their Dogs Came with Them (2007).

Short story collections 

Cuentos: Stories by Latinas (Contributor, 1983). 
The Moths and Other Stories (1985). . Includes "The Moths".

Bibliographical Resources 
https://faculty.ucmerced.edu/mmartin-rodriguez/index_files/vhViramontesHelena.htm

Further reading 

Rupali Das, MD, MPH; Andrea Steege, MPH; Sherry Baron, MD, MPH; John Beckman, Robert Harrison, MD, MPH. "Pesticide-related Illness among Migrant Farm Workers in the United States." International Journal of Occupational Environmental Health 7, 2001: 303–312.
Rebozos de palabras: An Helena María Viramontes Critical Reader. Edited by Gabriella Gutiérrez y Muhs. 2003.
"Environmental Toxins: Changes Needed to Reduce Migrant Farm Worker Exposure to Pesticides." Cancer Weekly (20 Jan. 2004): 56–7.
"Recoding Consumer Culture: Ester Hernández, Helena María Viramontes, and the Farmworker Cause." Journal of Popular Culture (October 2013): 973–990.
"You talk 'Merican?": Class, Value, and the Social Production of Difference in Helena Maria Viramontes's Under the Feet of Jesus."
College Literature (2014): 41-73.
The Nature of California: Race, Citizenship, and Farming since the Dust Bowl. 2016.
"Their Bones Kept Them Moving: Latinx Studies, Helena Maria Viramontes's "Under the Feet of Jesus," and the Crosscurrents of Ecocriticism." Contemporary Literature, (2017): 361–391.
Latinx Environmentalisms: Place, Justice, and the Decolonial. 2019.

References

External links
Viramontes' home page at Cornell
Viramontes' home page
Guide to the Helena Maria Viramontes Papers CEMA 18 at the California Ethnic and Multicultural Archives
La Bloga 2007 Interview

Voices From the Gaps Bio/Criticism
UCSB Library
Helena Maria Viramontes' Facebook
CSULA 2010 Interview with Viramontes
Western American Literature Research: Helena Maria Viramontes
United States Environmental Protection Agency
Xicana literature
Pesticides "The Issue" 
Goodreads. Review of Under the Feet of Jesus
Garcia, Christina. Review of Under the Feet of Jesus

American women short story writers
American writers of Mexican descent
Writers from Los Angeles
Immaculate Heart College alumni
1954 births
Living people
20th-century American novelists
21st-century American novelists
American academics of English literature
American women novelists
Chicana feminists
Hispanic and Latino American novelists
Hispanic and Latino American short story writers
20th-century American women writers
21st-century American women writers
20th-century American short story writers
21st-century American short story writers
American women non-fiction writers
20th-century American non-fiction writers
21st-century American non-fiction writers